Na Umra Ki Seema Ho is an Indian Hindi-language drama television series that premiered on 26 July 2022. It airs on Star Bharat and digitally streams on Disney+ Hotstar from Monday to Saturday. Produced by Right Click Media Solutions, it stars Mohammed Iqbal Khan and Rachana Mistry in lead roles.

Plot 
A middle aged self-made businessman, Devvrat Raichand and naive, timid, innocent twenty-something year old Vidhi Sharma fall in love. The couple must face numerous hurdles and societal prejudices in order to be together.

Cast

Main 
Rachana Mistry as Vidhi Devvrat Raichand - Hariprasad and Vimala's daughter; Seema's sister; Dev's employee turned wife; (2022–present)
 Mohammed Iqbal Khan as Devvrat "Dev" Raichand - Shantanu's son; Satyavati's step-son; Abhimanyu and Chitra's elder step-brother; Vidhi's boss turned husband (2022–present)

Recurring
 Sneha Wagh as Amba "Ami" Mehta - Dev's friend and obsessive lover which he is already aware of; Vaikunth's daughter (2022–present)
 Deepshikha Nagpal as Satyavati Shantanu Raichand - Shantanu's second wife; Dev's step-mother; Abhimanyu and Chitra's mother (2022–present)
 Rishina Kandhari as Priya Abhimanyu Raichand - Abhimanyu's wife (2022–present)
 Aamna Sharif as Yamini (2023–present)
 Deepak Dutta as Hariprasad Sharma - Vimala's husband; Vidhi's father; Dev's father-in-law (2022–present)
 Hemaakshi Ujjain as Vimala Hariprasad Sharma - Hariprasad's wife; Vidhi's mother; Dev's mother-in-law (2022–present)
 Aarohi Patel / Tejaswi Bhadane as Seema - Hariprasad and Vimala's niece; Vidhi's sister (2022) / (2023–present)
 Ramshankar Singh as Abhimanyu Raichand - Satyavati and Shantanu's son; Dev's younger step-brother; Priya's husband; Chitra's brother (2022–present)
 Reena Singh as Damayanti - Satyavati's sister; Shantanu's sister-in-law; Dev and Abhimanyu's maternal aunt (2023–present)
 Vandana Rao as Chitra Raichand - Satyavati and Shantanu's daughter; Dev's younger step-sister; Vikram's wife; Abhimanyu's sister (2022–present)
 Rakesh Paul as Yogesh - Kanika's husband; Dev's business partner; Arjun's father (2022–present)
 Samidha Guru as Kanika - Yogesh's wife; Dev's business partner; Arjun's mother (2022–present)
 Swati Tarar as Urmila Sharma - Golden's mother; Vidhi and Seema's aunt (2022–present)
 Vijay Kalvani as Mr. Sharma - Urmila's husband; Hariprasad's brother; Golden's father; Vidhi and Seema's uncle (2022–present)
 Jinal Jain as Golden Sharma - Urmila's daughter; Vidhi and Seema's cousin (2022–present)
 Varsha Sharma as Divya Roy (2023–present)
 Surendra Pal as Pratap - Neeli's husband; Shantanu's best friend (2022)
 Hemant Choudhary as Damayanti's husband (2023–prsent)
 Daisy Shah Hundal
 Heena Rajput
 Madhubala Atri
 Rahul Vatsa
 Somendra Solanki as Arjun - Yogesh and Kanika's son (2022)
 Sonali Khare (2023–present)

Production

Development
The show's title is based on the song "Hothon Se Chhu Lo Tum" sung by Jagjit Singh from the 1981 film Prem Geet.

Casting
Rachana Mistry
and Iqbal Khan were cast as the leads.

Release
The first promo was released on 13 July 2022 and the first episode was released on 26 July 2022.

Soundtrack

Na Umra Ki Seema Ho soundtrack is composed by Paresh Shah. The title track is the theme song of Dev and Vidhi.

See also
List of programs broadcast by Star Bharat

References

External links
 Na Umra Ki Seema Ho on Disney+ Hotstar
 

Hindi-language television shows
2022 Indian television series debuts
Indian television soap operas
Indian drama television series
Star Bharat original programming